Pirnat is a surname from Slovenia. People with the surname include:

 Makso Pirnat (1875–1933), Slavic scholar, father of Nikolaj Pirnat
 Nikolaj Pirnat (1903–1948), Slovenian painter, sculptor, draftsman and illustrator
 Nina Pirnat, former director of the Slovenian National Institute of Public Health - see COVID-19 pandemic in Slovenia
 Rajko Pirnat (born 1951), Slovenian lawyer, politician and university professor
 Stanko Pirnat (1859–1899), Slovenian composer and lawyer

Slovene-language surnames